The Dean of Lincoln is the head of the Chapter of Lincoln Cathedral in the city of Lincoln, England in the Church of England Diocese of Lincoln. Christine Wilson was installed as Dean on 22 October 2016.

List of deans

High Medieval
 Ranulph or Ralph
aft. 1093–bef. 1133 Simon Bloet
–1141 Philip of Harcourt
1141–1179 Adelelm
–1182 Geoffrey
1183–1189 Richard FitzNeal
1190–1195 Hamo
–bef. 1223 Roger de Rolleston
1223–1239 William de Thornaco
1240–1245 Roger Weseham
1246–1254 Henry of Lexington
1254–1258 Richard of Gravesend
1260–1262 Robert de Mariscis
1262–1272 William of Lexington
1272–1274 Richard de Mepham
1274–1275 John de Maidenstan
1275–1280 Oliver Sutton
1280–1288 Nicholas de Hegham
1288–1305 Philip Willoughby

Late Medieval
1305 Joceline Kirmington
1305–1310 Raymond de Got
1310–1315 Roger Martival
1315–1328 Henry Mansfield
1329–1337 Antony Bek 
1340–1344 William Bateman
1344–1348 John de Ufford
1348–1349 Thomas Bradwardine
1349–1360 Simon Briselee
1361–? John Stretley
1376 a foreign Cardinal 
?–1378 Richard Ravenser
?–1412 John Sheppey
1412–1452 John Mackworth
1452–1483 Robert Flemming
1483–1505 George Fitzhugh
1506–1508 Geoffrey Symeon
1509–1514 Thomas Wolsey
1514–1528 John Constable
1528–1538 George Heneage
1539–1552 John Taylor

Early modern
1552–1554 Matthew Parker
1555–1570 Francis Mallet
1571–1577 John Whitgift
1577–1584 William Wickham
1585–1593 Ralph Griffin
1593–1598 John Rainolds
1598–1601 William Cole
1601–1613 Laurence Stanton
1613–1629 Roger Parker
1629–1649 Anthony Topham
1660–1681 Michael Honywood
1681–1695 Daniel Brevint
1695–1699 Samuel Fuller
1700–1701 Abraham Campion
1701–1721 Richard Willis
1721–1722 Robert Cannon
1722–1730 Edward Gee
1730–1743 Edward Willes
1744–1748 Thomas Cheney
1748–1756 William George
1756–1761 John Green
1762–1781 James Yorke
Robert Richardson – poss. nominated; d. 1781
1782–1783 Richard Cust
1783–1809 Sir Richard Kaye, 6th Baronet (styled Richard Kaye until 1789)

Late modern
1809–1845 George Gordon
1845–1860 John Ward
1860–1863 Thomas Garnier
1864 Francis Jeune
1864–1872 James Jeremie
1872–1885 Joseph Blakesley
1885–1894 William Butler
1894–1910 Edward Wickham
1910–1930 Thomas Fry
1930–1949 Robert Mitchell
1949–1964 Colin Dunlop (Assistant Bishop of Lincoln from 1950)
1965–1968 Michael Peck
1969–1989 Oliver Fiennes
1989–1997 Brandon Jackson
1998–2006 Alec Knight
2007–2016 Philip Buckler
31 January22 October 2016 (acting) John Patrick, Subdean
2016–present Christine Wilson

References

Sources
British History Online – Fasti Ecclesiae Anglicanae 1066–1300 – Deans of Lincoln
British History Online – Fasti Ecclesiae Anglicanae 1300–1541 – Deans of Lincoln
British History Online – Fasti Ecclesiae Anglicanae 1541–1857 – Deans of Lincoln
British History Online – A History of the County of Lincoln – Lincoln Cathedral

Diocese of Lincoln
 
Lists of English people